In geometry, a truncated dodecahedral prism is a convex uniform polychoron (four-dimensional polytope).

It is one of 18 convex uniform polyhedral prisms created by using uniform prisms to connect pairs of Platonic solids or Archimedean solids in parallel hyperplanes.

Alternative names 
 Truncated-dodecahedral dyadic prism (Norman W. Johnson) 
 Tiddip (Jonathan Bowers: for truncated-dodecahedral prism) 
 Truncated-dodecahedral hyperprism

See also
Truncated 120-cell,

External links 
 
 

4-polytopes